Dennehy is a surname of Irish origin. The original form in Irish is Ó Duineachdha, meaning descendant of Duineachaidh, who was a chieftain who fought the Danes in Limerick in 934. The name may mean "humane", or may mean "man from the fairy hills". Spelling variations include Denehy, Dennehey, Denehey, Danahy, Deniehy, and Denahy. The name may refer to:

Billy Dennehy (born 1987), Irish football player
Brian Dennehy (1938–2020), American actor
Daniel Deniehy (1828–1865), Australian writer and politician
Darren Dennehy (born 1988), Irish football player
Donnacha Dennehy (born 1970), Irish composer
Elizabeth Dennehy (born 1960), American actress
Joanna Dennehy, serial killer; see Peterborough ditch murders
John Dennehy (born 1940), Irish politician
Miah Dennehy (born 1950), Irish football player
Mick Dennehy (born 1950), American football player and coach
Ned Dennehy (born 1965), Irish actor
Peter Denahy (born 1972), Australian musician
Thomas Dennehy (1829–1915), British general
William Francis Dennehy (1853–1918), Irish writer

Surnames of Irish origin